The 2003–04 Oberliga season was the 45th season for the Oberliga, the then second-level ice hockey league in Germany. It was divided into two groups (South-West and North-East). REV Bremerhaven won the championship and were promoted. A total of 20 teams participated.

North-East

South-West

Final Round

Relegation round

Playoffs

External links
EliteProspects.com
HockeyDB.com

Ice hockey in Germany